Nicky Whelan (born 10 May 1981) is an Australian actress and model known for her role as Pepper Steiger in the Australian soap opera Neighbours.

Career 
Before Neighbours, Whelan hosted a number of shows, including Coxy's Big Break (Seven Network), Beyond the Boundary (Network Ten), and Melbourne Woman (Seven Network), and played the fictional celebrity "Chrissie Grant" on Russell Coight's Celebrity Challenge, a spin-off of All Aussie Adventures. 
Whelan is also known as the face of the rural Victorian city, Shepparton, and she hosted the night racing at Moonee Valley for eight years.
Whelan has also posed for a number of Australian magazines, including FHM (in October 2007), Ralph (in November 2005) and Inside Sport.

In November 2007, Whelan made a special appearance in Harrow, London, to promote sustainable transport and initiatives that benefit the environment. She also shot some photos for Harrow's 'It's Up to All of Us' campaign. At the event, she confirmed that after Neighbours, she had been in discussions over feature films.
Whelan was in the movie Hollywood and Wine in Los Angeles with David Spade.

Whelan appeared in the final season of Scrubs as Maya, an Australian medical-school student.
In November 2010, Whelan appeared in a viral advertisement for Rökk Vodka alongside The Lonely Island.
Whelan also played the role of Leigh in the 2011 film Hall Pass, which co-starred Owen Wilson, Jason Sudeikis, Jenna Fischer, and Christina Applegate.
In October 2011, Whelan guest-starred as an attractive telemarketing temp in the episode "Temp-Tress" of the American sitcom Workaholics, and appeared in the 2015 movie The Wedding Ringer starring Kevin Hart.

Whelan is currently starring in betting advertisements on Australian television for BetEasy.

Personal life 
Whelan was born in Cranbourne, Victoria, Australia. She is the granddaughter of Marcus Whelan, who played in the Victorian Football League in the 1930s and '40s.

In 2016, Whelan became engaged to American football player Kerry Rhodes. Whelan and Rhodes were married in Los Angeles on 15 April 2017, but divorced the same year in November.

In her spare time, Whelan also trains boxing as well as Brazilian jiu-jitsu.

Filmography

Film

Television

References

External links

1981 births
Australian female models
Australian soap opera actresses
Australian television presenters
Australian expatriate actresses in the United States
Living people
Actresses from Victoria (Australia)
21st-century Australian actresses
Australian film actresses
Australian women television presenters
People from Cranbourne, Victoria